Fourtou is a French surname. Notable people with the surname include:

 Janelly Fourtou (born 1939), French member of the European Parliament
 Jean-René Fourtou (born 1939), French business executive
 Oscar Bardi de Fourtou (1836–1897), French politician

French-language surnames